A football association, also known as a football federation, soccer federation, or soccer association, is a governing body for association football. Many of them are members of the sport's regional bodies such as UEFA and CONMEBOL and the world governing body, FIFA. A small number have not yet applied for or been granted entry to these higher bodies. Below is a list of football associations for which there are articles.

Asia

Asian Football Confederation affiliated

 Afghanistan Football Federation
 Football Federation Australia
 Bahrain Football Association
 Bangladesh Football Federation
 Bhutan Football Federation
 Football Association of Brunei Darussalam
 Myanmar Football Federation
 Football Federation of Cambodia
 Chinese Football Association
 Chinese Taipei Football Association
 East Timor Football Federation
 Guam Football Association
 Hong Kong Football Association
 All India Football Federation
 Football Association of Indonesia
 Football Federation Islamic Republic of Iran
 Iraq Football Association
 Japan Football Association
 Jordan Football Association
 Korea Football Association
 Kuwait Football Association
 Football Federation of the Kyrgyz Republic
 Lao Football Federation
 Lebanon Football Association
 Macau Football Association
 Football Association of Malaysia
 Football Association of Maldives
 Mongolian Football Federation
 All Nepal Football Association
 DPR Korea Football Association
 Northern Mariana Islands Football Association
 Oman Football Association
 Pakistan Football Federation
 Palestinian Football Association
 Philippine Football Federation
 Qatar Football Association
 Saudi Arabian Football Federation
 Football Association of Singapore
 Football Federation of Sri Lanka
 Syrian Football Association
 Tajikistan Football Federation
 Football Association of Thailand
 Football Federation of Turkmenistan
 United Arab Emirates Football Association
 Uzbekistan Football Federation
 Vietnam Football Federation
 Yemen Football Association

Defunct
 Brunei Football Association

Africa
Confederation of African Football affiliated

 Algerian Football Federation
 Angolan Football Federation
 Benin Football Federation
 Botswana Football Association
 Burkinabé Football Federation
 Football Federation of Burundi
 Cameroonian Football Federation
 Cape Verdean Football Federation
 Central African Football Federation
 Chadian Football Federation
 Comoros Football Federation
 Congolese Football Federation
 Congolese Association Football Federation
 Djiboutian Football Federation
 Egyptian Football Association
 Equatoguinean Football Federation
 Eritrean National Football Federation
 Eswatini Football Association
 Ethiopian Football Federation
 Gabonese Football Federation
 Gambia Football Association
 Ghana Football Association
 Guinean Football Federation
 Football Federation of Guinea-Bissau
 Ivorian Football Federation
 Football Kenya Federation
 Lesotho Football Association
 Liberia Football Association
 Libyan Football Federation
 Malagasy Football Federation
 Football Association of Malawi
 Malian Football Federation
 Football Federation of the Islamic Republic of Mauritania
 Mauritius Football Association
 Royal Moroccan Football Federation
 Mozambican Football Federation
 Namibia Football Association
 Nigerien Football Federation
 Nigeria Football Federation
 Réunionese Football League
 Rwandese Association Football Federation
 São Toméan Football Federation
 Senegalese Football Federation
 Seychelles Football Federation
 Sierra Leone Football Association
 Somali Football Federation
 South African Football Association
 Sudan Football Association
 South Sudan Football Association
 Tanzania Football Federation
 Togolese Football Federation
 Tunisian Football Federation
 Federation of Uganda Football Associations
 Football Association of Zambia
 Zanzibar Football Association
 Zimbabwe Football Association

North, Central America and Caribbean
Confederation of North, Central American and Caribbean Association Football affiliated

North America
North American Football Union

 Canadian Soccer Association
 Mexican Football Federation
 United States Soccer Federation

Central America
Central American Football Union

 Football Federation of Belize
 Costa Rican Football Federation
 Salvadoran Football Association
 National Football Federation of Guatemala
 National Autonomous Federation of Football of Honduras
 Nicaraguan Football Federation
 Panamanian Football Federation

Caribbean
Caribbean Football Union

 Anguilla Football Association
 Antigua and Barbuda Football Association
 Aruba Football Federation
 Bahamas Football Association
 Barbados Football Association
 Bermuda Football Association
 Bonaire Football Federation
 British Virgin Islands Football Association
 Cayman Islands Football Association
 Football Association of Cuba
 Curaçao Football Federation
 Dominica Football Association
 Dominican Football Federation
 Grenada Football Association
 Guadeloupean League of Football
 Guyana Football Federation
 Ligue de Football de la Guyane
 Haitian Football Federation
 Jamaica Football Federation
 Ligue de football de la Martinique
 Montserrat Football Association
 Puerto Rican Football Federation
 St. Kitts and Nevis Football Association
 Saint Lucia Football Association
 Football Committee of Saint Martin
 Saint Vincent and the Grenadines Football Federation
 Sint Maarten Soccer Association
 Surinamese Football Association
 Trinidad and Tobago Football Association
 Turks and Caicos Islands Football Association
 U.S. Virgin Islands Soccer Federation

Defunct
Netherlands Antillean Football Union

South America 
South American Football Confederation affiliated

 Argentine Football Association
 Bolivian Football Federation
 Brazilian Football Confederation
 Chilean Football Federation
 Colombian Football Federation
 Ecuadorian Football Federation
 Paraguayan Football Association
 Peruvian Football Federation
 Uruguayan Football Association
 Venezuelan Football Federation

Oceania
Oceania Football Confederation affiliated

 Football Federation American Samoa
 Cook Islands Football Association
 Fiji Football Association
 Kiribati Islands Football Association
 New Caledonian Football Federation
 New Zealand Football
 Papua New Guinea Football Association
 Football Federation Samoa
 Solomon Islands Football Federation
 Tahitian Football Federation
 Tonga Football Association
 Tuvalu National Football Association
 Vanuatu Football Federation

Europe
Union of European Football Associations affiliated

 Albanian Football Association
 Andorran Football Federation
 Football Federation of Armenia
 Austrian Football Association
 Association of Football Federations of Azerbaijan
 Football Federation of Belarus
 Royal Belgian Football Association
 Football Federation of Bosnia and Herzegovina
 Bulgarian Football Union
 Croatian Football Federation
 Cyprus Football Association
 Football Association of the Czech Republic
 Danish Football Association
 The Football Association
 Estonian Football Association
 Faroe Islands Football Association
 Football Association of Finland
 French Football Federation
 Georgian Football Federation
 German Football Association
 Gibraltar Football Association
 Hellenic Football Federation
 Hungarian Football Federation
 Football Association of Iceland
 Football Association of Ireland
 Israel Football Association
 Italian Football Federation
 Football Federation of Kazakhstan
 Football Federation of Kosovo
 Latvian Football Federation
 Liechtenstein Football Association
 Lithuanian Football Federation
 Luxembourg Football Federation
 Football Federation of Macedonia
 Malta Football Association
 Football Association of Moldova
 Football Association of Montenegro
 Royal Dutch Football Association
 Irish Football Association
 Football Association of Norway
 Polish Football Association
 Portuguese Football Federation
 Romanian Football Federation
 Russian Football Union
 San Marino Football Federation
 Scottish Football Association
 Football Association of Serbia
 Slovak Football Association
 Football Association of Slovenia
 Royal Spanish Football Federation
 Swedish Football Association
 Swiss Football Association
 Turkish Football Federation
 Football Federation of Ukraine
 Football Association of Wales

Defunct

 Deutscher Fußball-Verband der DDR (East Germany)
 Saarland Football Association
 Football Association of Serbia and Montenegro
 Football Federation of the Soviet Union
 Football Association of Yugoslavia

Notes

Association football terminology
Sports governing bodies